The East Anniston Residential Historic District, in Anniston, Alabama, was listed on the National Register of Historic Places in 1993.

The district runs roughly along Leighton and Christine Avenues from 11th St. to 22nd Sts. and along Woodstock Ave. from 11th St. to Rocky Hollow.

It includes Prairie School, Bungalow/craftsman, and Queen Anne architecture.

It includes:
Crowan Cottage, already NRHP-listed
Kilby House, already NRHP-listed
Saint Paul's Methodist Episcopal Church, already NRHP-listed

References

External links

National Register of Historic Places in Calhoun County, Alabama
Historic districts on the National Register of Historic Places in Alabama
Queen Anne architecture in Alabama